This page describes the qualifying round for the Eurocup Basketball 2010–11. 

The qualifying round consisted of one round, played in home and away series.

Draw
There was a seeded draw. Teams were separated into two seeds according to the Club Ranking in the European competitions. The 1 Seed played the second game of each series at home. Teams entering the draw following a renouncement were seeded according to the Club Ranking. Teams granted a Wild Card by ECA were seeded above the rest of the teams.

Matches

First leg

Second leg

Beşiktaş Cola Turka won 152-137 on aggregate

Hapoel Jerusalem won 146-132 on aggregate

Aris BSA 2003 won 170-167 on aggregate

Gran Canaria 2014 won 165-131 on aggregate

BC Azovmash won 155-145 on aggregate

Galatasaray Café Crown won 139-136 on aggregate

Benetton Basket Bwin won 181-118 on aggregate

Cedevita Zagreb won 169-134 on aggregate

External links
EuroCup Official Website

Qualifying round